is a former Japanese football player.

Club career
Osada was born in Sayama on March 5, 1978. He joined Verdy Kawasaki (later Tokyo Verdy) from youth team in 1996. Although he debuted in 1997, his opportunity to play was small and he moved to Vissel Kobe in 1999. He played many matches at Vissel. He moved to Kyoto Purple Sanga in 2001. He returned to Tokyo Verdy in 2002. After that, he played for Regional Leagues club Okinawa Kariyushi FC and Shizuoka FC. He retired end of 2004 season.

National team career
In August 1993, Osada was selected Japan U-17 national team for 1993 U-17 World Championship. He played full time in all 4 matches. In June 1997, he was also selected Japan U-20 national team for 1997 World Youth Championship, but he did not play in the match.

Club statistics

References

External links

library.footballjapan.jp
sports.geocities.jp

1978 births
Living people
Association football people from Saitama Prefecture
Japanese footballers
Japan youth international footballers
J1 League players
J2 League players
Tokyo Verdy players
Vissel Kobe players
Kyoto Sanga FC players
Association football midfielders